Goat Mountain is a mountain peak rising east of the Crown Pass, located directly north of Grouse Mountain in North Vancouver, British Columbia, Canada. An approximate 8 km, 4 hour, round-trip hike from Grouse Mountain, Goat Mountain is popular with local hikers, as its steep summit tower provides excellent views over the Greater Vancouver area, Howe Sound, Washington state, the Strait of Georgia, Vancouver Island, and the Coast Mountains. It also offers area for bouldering east of its summit.

References

One-thousanders of British Columbia
Pacific Ranges
New Westminster Land District